The National Association of Decorative and Fine Arts Societies (NADFAS), operating under the name The Arts Society, is a national organisation in the United Kingdom promoting education in the arts and the preservation of artistic heritage.

It was founded in 1968 and operates through a network of regional membership societies, with a headquarters in London. It is a registered charity under English law. 

The charity was rebranded as The Arts Society in 2017, but retains its official name.

Its founding President was Sir Trenchard Cox.  Her Royal Highness The Duchess of Gloucester is the society's patron, and Loyd Grossman is its president.

In 2020 it launched The Arts Society Connected, a digital platform hosting a series of free online lectures and other arts activities, to support its members and other people aged over 70 who were self-isolating during the COVID-19 pandemic in the United Kingdom.

See also
Art Fund

References

External links

The Arts Society Connected

Arts organisations based in the United Kingdom
Charities based in London
Heritage organisations in the United Kingdom
1968 establishments in the United Kingdom